Arction Ltd is a software company founded in Kuopio, Finland in 2007, which specializes in the development of high-performance software components for data visualization. Arction provides solutions to companies around the world (including Intel, Toyota, Samsung etc.), as well as to governmental organizations.

Arction also offers radial gauges for WPF and Silverlight.

References 

Finnish companies established in 2007
Software companies of Finland
Software companies established in 2007